Prince Isariyabhorn or Phra Chao Boromwongse Ther Phra Ong Chao Isariyabhorn (RTGS: Isariyaphorn) (21 October 1888 – 21 September 1892), was a Prince of Siam (later Thailand. He was a member of the Siamese Royal Family. He was a son of Chulalongkorn, King Rama V of Siam.

His mother was Kesara Sanidvongse, daughter of Savasdi Sanidvongse. He had a younger brother, Prince Anusara Siriprasadh.

Prince Isariyabhorn died at the age of 3 years and  11 months on 21 September 1892.

Ancestry

1888 births
1892 deaths
Thai male Phra Ong Chao
Children of Chulalongkorn
19th-century Thai royalty who died as children
19th-century Chakri dynasty
Sons of kings